Si Litvinoff (April 5, 1929 – December 26, 2022) was an American film producer and lawyer. He served as a producer on Walkabout, All the Right Noises, and the documentary The Queen. He also served as an executive producer on A Clockwork Orange and The Man Who Fell to Earth. In 1954, he received his law degree from New York University. When he was a lawyer, his clients included Rip Torn, Andy Warhol, Bea Arthur, and Alan Arkin. Litvinoff was a member of the Academy of Motion Picture Arts and Sciences and its foreign language screening committee. 

Litvinoff died in Los Angeles on December 26, 2022, at the age of 93.

References

External links

1929 births
2022 deaths
American film producers
American lawyers
People from New York City